James Kennedy (1798–1859) was a British Member of Parliament.

Kennedy was elected as a Radical MP for the Constituency of Tiverton, Devon at the General Election of 1832. 

Kennedy's election was challenged by the Whigs, who petitioned that his nomination at the time had not been strictly legal, due to the property requirements. The petition led to his election being declared void, and his having to fight a further by-election in May 1833, which he won against the Whig contender Benjamin Wood, who had been the third placed candidate in the 1832 General Election.

After fighting again to retain his seat at the General Election in February 1835, Kennedy left Parliament in July, "Taking the Chiltern Hundreds" and retiring conveniently at a time when Viscount Palmerston found himself without a seat in Parliament and forcing a by-election which Palmerston won comfortably. In Palmerston's Biography by K. Bourne it is reported that "The impecunious Kennedy" was paid £2000 for vacating the seat. 

Kennedy was then appointed (by Palmerston) as a judge to the joint British and Spanish Mixed Court of Justice in Havana in post from 1837 to 1839.

References

External links 
 http://electionhub.co.uk/uk/1832/const/tiverton
 https://issuu.com/fcohistorians/docs/history_notes_cover_hphn_17
 http://www.historyofparliamentonline.org/volume/1820-1832/constituencies/tiverton

1798 births
1859 deaths
Radicals (UK)
Members of the Parliament of the United Kingdom for English constituencies
UK MPs 1832–1835